Wilhelmus à Brakel (2 January 1635 – 30 October 1711), also known as "Father Brakel", was a Reformed minister and theologian. He was a contemporary of Gisbertus Voetius and Hermann Witsius and a major representative of the Dutch Further Reformation (known in Dutch as De Nadere Reformatie).

Biography 
à Brakel was best known for his work with the Further Reformation, which was contemporaneous with and greatly influenced by English Puritanism. Scholars in the Netherlands have defined this movement as follows:

à Brakel and his ministry functioned at the approximate center of this Pietistic movement, both historically and theologically. Beginning in 1606 with the ministry of his father, Willem Teellinck of the Further Reformation, and terminating in 1784 with the death of Theodorus Vander Groe, à Brakel's ministry, particularly his most important pastorate in Rotterdam from 1683 to 1711, falls in the middle of the timeline. More significantly, his ministry represented a remarkable balance of the Further Reformation relative to both its early and concluding stages.

The Christian's Reasonable Service 
à Brakel's prominence as a major representative of this movement is largely due to his magnum opus, The Christian's Reasonable Service. After its initial publication in 1700, his four-volume work was soon recognized as a monumental contribution to the literature of the Further Reformation. It has been argued by scholars that this work is a synthesis of the best Puritan literature published in England and the Netherlands. Further Reformation scholar F. Earnest Stoeffler stated, “He supplied Reformed Pietism with a theological textbook which came out of a tradition wholly native to the Netherlands. He preserved the balance between the mystical and ethical elements in Christianity which is so characteristic of the great Pietists in the Reformed communion.”

As a result of this work, à Brakel has become important to Reformed believers in the Netherlands, both during his lifetime and beyond. He is fondly referred to as “Father Brakel”, a title by which he is still known in the Netherlands. For more than three centuries, the influence of The Christian's Reasonable Service has been such that à Brakel continues to be one of the most significant representatives of the Further Reformation. Since the publication of The Christian's Reasonable Service in English, his reputation has grown among scholars and followers of Puritan literature.

à Brakel's work is particularly distinguished for going beyond the systematic theology found at the time. His selection of the title is an indication that it was not his intention to merely present a systematic explanation of Christian dogma to the public. In directly quoting the Bible for his title, à Brakel indicated to Christians that it is an entirely reasonable matter for a man to quote the Bible to show belief and following of the book. His choice also conveyed that God asks men to serve him in spirit and truth, doing so in a reasonable manner.

à Brakel wrote this work for church members and not for theologians, though he hoped that theologians could benefit from it as well. To accomplish this, he ensured that The Christian's Reasonable Service was permeated with a practical application of the doctrines he explains. In his writing, à Brakel wished that the principles he expounded could become an experiential reality to those who read his work. He established the crucial relationship between objective beliefs and the subjective experience of those beliefs.

Experiential theology explains how the doctrines of the Bible become a reality in the hearts and lives of believers. Religious experiences are seen as bringing religious beliefs from text into subjective involvement. In the theological sections of his chapters, à Brakel lays the groundwork for experiential application. His aim in practicing theology is to edify believers. He does this by describing what the experiential application of the expounded doctrine should be and by describing what it often is when believers struggle to appropriate the words of the Bible.

Works

Brakel, Wilhelmus à. The Christian's Reasonable Service. 4 vols. Translated by Bartel Elshout. Grand Rapids, Michigan—Reformation Heritage Books.
Brakel, Wilhelmus à.  à Brakel's Commentary on Revelation in the appendix of The Christian's Reasonable Service. 1 vol. Translated by Historicism Research Foundation.

References

External links

1635 births
1711 deaths
17th-century Dutch Calvinist and Reformed ministers
Dutch Calvinist and Reformed theologians
Dutch members of the Dutch Reformed Church
17th-century Calvinist and Reformed theologians
People from Leeuwarden